Kina is a given name and surname. Notable people with the name include:

Given name
 Kina (musician) (born Kina Cosper in 1969), American musician and former member of Brownstone
 Kina Collins (born 1991), American political activist
 Kina Grannis (born 1985), American guitarist and singer-songwriter
Kina Konova (1872–1952), Bulgarian educator, translator, publicist and women's rights activist
Kina Malpartida (born 1980), Peruvian boxer

Surname
Gunsanad Kina (1840–1930), Malaysian politician
Laura Kina (born 1973), American artist and academic
Pascal Kina, Belgian field hockey coach
Sedomon Gunsanad Kina (1894–1966), Malaysian politician, son of Gunsanad
Shoukichi Kina (born 1948), Japanese rock musician and politician
Tetsuhiro Kina (born 1976), Japanese football player
, Japanese wheelchair racer